James Harbison (22 September 1911 – 27 November 1982) was an Australian rules footballer who played with Geelong in the Victorian Football League (VFL).

Notes

External links 

1911 births
1982 deaths
Australian rules footballers from Victoria (Australia)
Geelong Football Club players
Daylesford Football Club players